Greiz I is an electoral constituency (German: Wahlkreis) represented in the Landtag of Thuringia. It elects one member via first-past-the-post voting. Under the current constituency numbering system, it is designated as constituency 39. It covers the western part of the district of Greiz.

Greiz I was created for the 1994 state election. Since 1999, it has been represented by Volker Emde of the Christian Democratic Union (CDU).

Geography
As of the 2019 state election, Greiz I covers the western part of the district of Greiz, specifically the municipalities of Auma-Weidatal, Bad Köstritz, Bocka, Caaschwitz, Crimla, Harth-Pöllnitz, Hartmannsdorf, Hohenleuben, Hundhaupten, Kraftsdorf, Kühdorf, Langenwetzendorf, Langenwolschendorf, Lederhose, Lindenkreuz, Münchenbernsdorf, Saara, Schwarzbach, Weida, Weißendorf, Zedlitz, and Zeulenroda-Triebes.

Members
The constituency has been held by the Christian Democratic Union since its creation in 1994. Its first representative was Peter Schütz, who served from 1994 to 1999. Since 1999, it has been represented by Volker Emde.

Election results

2019 election

2014 election

2009 election

2004 election

1999 election

1994 election

References

Electoral districts in Thuringia
1994 establishments in Germany
Greiz (district)
Constituencies established in 1994